The 1920 capture of Damascus was the final stage of the Franco-Syrian War, when French forces captured Damascus with little resistance. The Kingdom of Syria was brought to an end and the French mandate of Syria was put into effect. Shortly after, in September 1920, Damascus was established as the capital of the State of Damascus under French Mandate.

History
The war of the Hashemites against the French, which erupted in January 1920, shortly became a devastating campaign for the new proclaimed Arab Kingdom of Syria. Worried about the results of a long bloody fight with the French, King Faisal himself surrendered on 14 July 1920, but his message would not reach King Faisal's defense minister Yusuf al-'Azma, who ignoring the King, led an army to Maysalun to defend Syria from French advance. The Battle of Maysalun resulted in a crushing Syrian defeat. The French troops later marched on Damascus and captured it on 24 July 1920.

French troops met little resistance from the inhabitants of Damascus, but there were shootouts between the French and residents of the Shaghour and Midan neighborhoods at the outset of the French entry. A Pro-French government under the leadership of Aladdin al-Droubi was installed the next day.

See also
French expedition in Syria
Syrian Revolution
Sultan al-Atrash
List of modern conflicts in the Middle East

References

Franco-Syrian War
1920 in Mandatory Syria
20th century in Damascus
July 1920 events
20th-century military history of France